Trio for violin, cello and piano in A minor, Stiles 1.2.2.1 TrA, is one of Alfred Hill's five compositions for such ensemble. It was written probably in 1890s and reconstructed by Allan Stiles in early 2000s. Its approximate duration is 20 minutes.

This Trio was reworked by Hill into his Violin Sonata No. 3 between 1906 and 1910 (while the Sonata itself was later arranged for flute and piano — Flute Sonata No. 2).

Structure 
The Trio consists of three movements, all in A minor.

I. Allegro con brio
II. Waiata Aroha. Andantino
III. Finale. Allegro moderato

Editions 
 Alfred Hill. Trio in A Minor for violin, violoncello, and pianoforte. [Narara, N.S.W.]: Stiles Music Publications, 2003 (pub. number S66-2003; ISMN 979-0-720029-67-2) — piano score and parts

Recordings 
 Salzburg Piano Trio (Salzburger Klaviertrio: Angelika Schopper, Scott Stiles, Caroline Anna Moldaschl) — Hill & Brahms: Piano trios / Klaviertrios — 2004 [SKT 2004-01]

References 

Compositions by Alfred Hill
Compositions in A minor
Hill